The Puyallup Glacier is a glacier on the west flank of Mount Rainier in Washington. Sharing the same source of ice as the northern South Mowich Glacier, the Puyallup Glacier begins as a branch off the ice stream that flow out of the Sunset Amphitheater. Leaving the large expanse of ice, the glacier flows down a small valley, it narrows significantly as it turns northwestward. The glacier gives rise to the Puyallup River.

See also
List of glaciers

References

Glaciers of Mount Rainier
Glaciers of Washington (state)